MOODS CONDOMS is a manufacturer of condoms made from natural rubber latex. It is manufactured by HLL Lifecare Limited, an undertaking by the Government of India. HLL was started off in 1966 with the objective of producing condoms for the National Family Planning Program. Moods Condoms came into existence in mid-1968, when HLL Lifecare Limited decided to develop a product to target the premium and upper middle class segment of the urban population in India. HLL today is one of the world's largest manufacturers of condoms. As of December 2012, its annual production totals around 800 million pieces across the globe.

The Moods brand, from the stable of the public sector enterprise (PSE), HLL Lifecare Limited, operates in the premium segment. Moods is present in many overseas markets in nearly 30 countries, such as Africa, South America and UAE and is soon to launch in the UK and the US.

History and origin
Critical to the success of the small family happy family campaign of the Government of India, In 1966, the Ministry of Health and Family Welfare set up HLL Lifecare Limited (HLL), and then called Hindustan Latex Limited, in the natural rubber-rich state of Kerala for the production of condoms to support the National Family Planning Programme.

HLL established its first plant at Peroorkada in Trivandrum ( Thiruvananthapuram) in technical collaboration with Okamoto Industries of Japan. The second and third plants were added in 1985 at Trivandrum and Belgaum. Two years later, HLL which had set its sights on the premium-end of the market, developed a brand called Moods.

The first advertising campaign for Moods was popularly known as the Moods Please campaign and it succeeded in making this evocative name synonymous with the product. Export orders from the Middle East followed in 2004 which opened up the international market for this popular brand. Pressed for capacity, HLL commissioned another manufacturing unit at the company’s Peroorkada plant in November 2007, raising its status to amongst the largest condom manufacturing facilities in the world.

In March 2009, the first dedicated Moods retail outlet, Moodsplanet, was inaugurated in Thiruvananthapuram, as a one-stop shop for the entire range of Moods contraceptives.

Product
The logo of the brand OO represents the bonding between couples. It has diversified into several variants. The range includes close to twenty variants viz. ultrathin, dotted and all night to different flavours; and also scented condoms; glow condoms; XXX condoms with dots and ribs and as Absolute Xtasy, Extra Long, Colored and Skin.

Its first advertising campaign was popularly known as the Moods Please campaign and succeeded in making this evocative name synonymous with the product. Later it came up with different advertising campaigns which include My Man!,Your Time, Your Place, Your Moods!! and the recent one "Play it Right"

See also
KamaSutra (brand)

References

 http://www.moodsplanet.com
 http://www.lifecarehll.com/page/render/reference/Social_Marketing
 http://articles.economictimes.indiatimes.com/2011-12-07/news/30485791_1_hll-lifecare-m-ayyappan-brand
 PSI Research Summary - Output Tracking Surveys – Round One, December 2006

External links
 Moods official site

Condom brands
Indian brands